Dawoud Sulaiman Ali Sulaiman Al Kuetei (born 21 February 1990) is an Emirati professional footballer who plays as a goalkeeper.

External links 
 Arabian Gulf League profile
 

1990 births
Living people
Association football goalkeepers
UAE Pro League players
Emirati footballers
Al Ain FC players
Baniyas Club players